The Padas River is a river in Interior Division, southwestern Sabah of Malaysia. Its source is originated from the mountains in the interior Beaufort, Keningau and Tenom Districts, which part of the Crocker Range system.

Features 
The river is important to provide water supply to Labuan and both districts of Beaufort and Tenom including as the main source of hydroelectric power to entire west coast of Sabah. The river is among the destination for water rafting activities in Sabah aside from Liwagu and Kiulu River.

See also 
 List of rivers of Malaysia

Further reading

References

External links 
 

Rivers of Sabah
Nature sites of Malaysia
Rivers of Malaysia